The Salisbury is a Grade II* listed pub on Grand Parade in Harringay, North London.

History

The Salisbury was designed and built by John Cathles Hill, founder of The London Brick Company. The pub was opened in 1899 with W. A. Cathles, a cousin of Hill, as the manager.

It caused something of a stir when it opened, being described by the trade journal, The Licensed Victualler and Catering Trades' Journal in the most glowing terms:

In 2003, following a period of dilapidation and decline, and temporary closure, it was sympathetically restored and reopened.

In 2008, beer and architecture experts Geoff Brandwood and Jane Jephcote, selected The Salisbury as one of London's top ten heritage pubs in their book, London Heritage Pubs – An Inside Story.

Architectural details

The exterior is classified as French Renaissance style with shaped gables, ogee domed cupolas and large pedimented dormers. It is constructed of red brick with stone bands and dressings. Its slated mansard roof has a high central tower topped with a wrought-iron crown. The pub has three stories and attic. 
Polished black larvikite Corinthian pilasters support the fascia. The entrances have ornate wrought-iron screens above imposts, with elaborately tiled lobbies and mosaic floors.

The pub's interior was described by the architectural historian Mark Girouard as a magnificently elaborate and complete interior.

On the first floor there is a large room at the front which was in the past used as a restaurant and concert room. It has an elaborate, compartmented ceiling with ornate fibrous plasterwork, all by the Mural Decoration Company. There is also notable engraved glass by Cakebread & Robey in the doors separating off the residential part of the building. This floor was previously used as a church, but has recently been renovated into an expansive luxury apartment.

The bar area has a compartmented ceiling with cast-iron columns. There is a large, curved wooden bar with a stone trough at its base. The bar forms a complete rectangle serving all parts of the large space. The saloon and public bars are divided by a wooden, arched screen containing glass engraved with Art Nouveau motifs.  At the rear is the former billiard room, now a function room and kitchen, with top-lit roof glass painted with a creeping vine motif. There are many elaborate engraved mirrors, some stained-glass windows and fire surrounds.

Gallery

In film

The level of original detailing in the pub has led to the interior being chosen as a location for a number of films:Chaplin, 1992, director Richard AttenboroughThe Long Good Friday, 1980, director John MackenzieSpider, 2002, director David Cronenberg

See also
The Queens, Crouch End

References

External links

 CAMRA North London – Salisbury profile
 BBC – Salisbury profile
  Harringay online – website for Harringay residents awarded a Special Judges' Commendation'' at the Catalyst Awards 2008.
 YouTube video of the little seen first floor of The Salisbury

Pubs in the London Borough of Haringey
Grade II* listed buildings in the London Borough of Haringey
National Inventory Pubs
Tourist attractions in the London Borough of Haringey
Commercial buildings completed in 1899
Grade II* listed pubs in London
1899 establishments in England
Buildings by John Cathles Hill
Harringay
19th-century architecture in the United Kingdom